Empress Dong may refer to:

Empress Dowager Dong (died 189), empress dowager during the Han dynasty
Empress Dong (Ran Min's wife) ( 350–352), wife of Ran Min, emperor of the Ran Wei state

See also
 Queen Dong (1623–1681), queen of the Tungning Kingdom
 Dong (disambiguation)

Dong